The Ready Reserve is a U.S. Department of Defense program which maintains a pool of trained service members that may be recalled to active duty should the need arise.  It is composed of service members that are contracted to serve in the Ready Reserve for a specified period of time as a reservist or in active duty status.  Members of the Ready Reserve are required to be prepared for mobilization or re-activation within a specified period of time, maintain a serviceable uniform, and maintain a degree of fitness.

The Ready Reserve, Standby Reserve, and the Retired Reserve make up the Reserve component of the Armed Forces of the United States.

Composition 
The Ready Reserve is divided into three programs:
 The Selected Reserve,
 The Individual Ready Reserve, and
 The Inactive National Guard.

Legal basis 
The Ready Reserve is prescribed by law in U.S. Code Title 10 "ARMED FORCES", Subtitle E "Reserve Components", Chapter 1209.  Specific provisions for creation of the Ready Reserve can be found in sections 12301(a) and 12302. Other sections describe rules for recall to Active Duty (sec. 12301(d), 12303, 12304) and suspension of retirement or separation (sec. 12305).

See also
 Ready Reserve Force
 Reserve component of the Armed Forces of the United States
 Selected Reserve
 Stop-loss policy
 United States Army Reserve
 United States Navy Reserve

References 

Reserve forces of the United States